The , also known as the  region, is the westernmost region of Honshū, the largest island of Japan. It consists of the prefectures of Hiroshima, Okayama, Shimane, Tottori and Yamaguchi. In 2010, it had a population of 7,563,428.

History
Chūgoku literally means "middle country", but the origin of the name is unclear. Historically, Japan was divided into a number of provinces called koku, which were in turn classified according to both their power and their distances from the administrative center in Kansai. Therefore, one explanation is that Chūgoku was originally used to refer to the collection of "middle countries" to the west of the capital. However, only five (fewer than half) of the provinces normally considered part of Chūgoku region were in fact classified as middle countries, and the term never applied to the many middle countries to the east of Kansai. Therefore, an alternative explanation is that Chūgoku referred to provinces between Kansai and Kyūshū, which was historically important as the link between Japan and mainland Asia.

However, because some of the easternmost provinces were later subsumed into prefectures based primarily in Kansai, those areas are, strictly speaking, not part of the Chūgoku region in modern usage.

In Japanese, the characters  and the reading Chūgoku began to be used to mean "China" after the founding of the Republic of China. The same characters are used in Chinese to refer to China, but pronounced Zhōngguó, lit. "Middle Kingdom" or "Middle Country" (Wade Giles: Chung1-kuo2). It is similar to the use of the West Country in English for a region of England.

The city of Hiroshima, the "capital" of the Chūgoku region, was rebuilt after being destroyed by an atomic bomb in 1945, and is now an industrial metropolis of more than one million people.

From the founding of the Republic of China to the end of the WW2, China was called  in order to avoid confusing the Chūgoku region. Due to the extensive use of this word during the Sino-Japanese War, the term shina has become an offensive word and was abandoned thereafter, and Chūgoku has since then been used instead of shina. In modern times, primarily in the tourism industry, for the same purpose, the Chūgoku region is also called the "San'in‐San'yō region". San'in ("yin of the mountains") is the northern part facing the Sea of Japan. San'yō ("yang of the mountains") is the southern part facing the Seto Inland Sea. These names were created using the yin and yang‐based place‐naming scheme.

Overfishing and pollution reduced the productivity of the Inland Sea fishing grounds; and San'yo is an area concentrated on heavy industry. In contrast, San'in is less industrialized with an agricultural economy.

Geography

The Chūgoku region consists of the following prefectures: Hiroshima, Yamaguchi, Shimane, and Tottori. Okayama is also included, although only Bitchū Province was considered a Middle Country; Mimasaka Province and Bizen Province, the other two components of modern-day Okayama, were considered Near Countries. Kyūshū, Shikoku, and Kansai neighbor the Chūgoku region.

The Chūgoku region is characterized by irregular rolling hills and limited plain areas and is divided into two distinct parts by mountains running east and west through its center.

Demographics 
The two largest metropolitan areas in Chūgoku region are Hiroshima and Okayama  whose total population of the two metropolitan areas amount to 2.808 million as of 2020.
Their Urban Employment Area amounts to around 3 million people for the Chūgoku region. The rest of Chūgoku region is sparsely populated and very rural.

Per Japanese census data, Chūgoku region as a whole has experienced a steady population decline since 1992 with some prefectures within the region experiencing the decline since 1985. The region reached a peak population of roughly 7.8 million in 1991.

Cities
Designated cities
Hiroshima (population: 1,200,000)
Okayama (population: 720,000)

Core cities
Kurashiki (population: 480,000)
Fukuyama (population: 460,000)
Shimonoseki (population: 260,000)
Kure (population: 220,000)
Matsue (population: 210,000)
Tottori (population: 200,000)

Other major cities
Yamaguchi (population: 200,000)

Sightseeing 

 Hiroshima Prefecture: Hiroshima, Miyajima, Fukuyama, Onomichi
 Okayama Prefecture: Okayama, Kurashiki, Takahashi, Tsuyama, Niimi, Bizen, Tamano
 Shimane Prefecture: Tsuwano, Izumo, Matsue, Iwami Ginzan
 Tottori Prefecture: Tottori, Misasa, Daisen, Kurayoshi
 Yamaguchi Prefecture: Shimonoseki, Yamaguchi, Iwakuni, Hofu, Hagi, Akiyoshidai

Fiction
 Lian Hearn used a feudal Chūgoku (translated as the Middle Country) as the setting for her Tales of the Otori trilogy.
 In B. Ichi, Chugoku is referred to as "the land of martial arts".

See also
 Geography of Japan
 List of regions in Japan
 Names of China
 San'in region
 San'yō region
 Chūgoku dialect and Umpaku dialect

References

Bibliography
 
 Tony Gibb By Bike around Chugoku

External links

 Information about Chugoku and Seto Inland Sea regions
 Into You WEST JAPAN Chugoku